Jack Ryder may refer to:
Jack Ryder (actor) (born 1981), British actor
Jack Ryder (cricketer) (1889–1977), Australian cricketer
Jack Ryder (American football) (1871–1936), American sportswriter and football coach
Jack McBride Ryder (born 1928), second president of Saginaw Valley State College
Jack Van Ryder (1899–1967), American artist
Jack Ryder, character in the Canadian animated series Odd Job Jack
Jack Ryder, real name of the DC Comics character Creeper

See also
John Ryder (disambiguation)